Hoberman is a surname. Notable people with the surname include:

Ben Hoberman (1922–2014), American radio executive
Brent Hoberman, founder of Lastminute.com
Chuck Hoberman, American designer and architect
David Hoberman (born 1952), American film producer
Haggai Hoberman, Israeli journalist and author
J. Hoberman, American film critic
John Hoberman, Professor of Germanic languages at the University of Texas at Austin
John Milton Hoberman, American author
Mary Ann Hoberman (born 1930), American writer
Nicky Hoberman (born 1967), South African artist
Perry Hoberman, American artist

See also
Hoberman Arch
Hoberman sphere